Mokhtari (also Romanized as Mokhtārī) is a village in Pain Rokh Rural District, Jolgeh Rokh District, Torbat-e Heydarieh County, Razavi Khorasan Province, Iran. At the 2006 census, its population was 119, in 29 families.

References 

Populated places in Torbat-e Heydarieh County